The chestnut-bellied guan (Penelope ochrogaster) is a species of bird in the family Cracidae. It is found only in Brazil. Its natural habitats are subtropical or tropical dry forest and subtropical or tropical swampland. It is threatened by habitat loss.

Appearance
The Chestnut-Bellied Guan is a medium-sized bird that is light brown at the head, fading darker approaching the wings and even darker at the tail. There is white spots from the chest to the abdomen and on the wing coverts. The Chestnut-Bellied Guan shows a bright red set of plumage on the chest and the facial skin is dusky.

Voice
The song of the Chestnut-Bellied Guan is described as 'crowlike' and 'rough'

Location
The Chestnut-Belied Guan is distributed throughout the northeastern part of Brazil, however, the three big clusters are in Pantanal, Central Brazil, and along the São Francisco river segment that runs through Rio de Janeiro.

References

External links
BirdLife Species Factsheet.

chestnut-bellied guan
Birds of the Cerrado
Birds of the Pantanal
Endemic birds of Brazil
chestnut-bellied guan
chestnut-bellied guan
Vulnerable animals
Taxonomy articles created by Polbot